Mauro Bettin (born 21 December 1968) is an Italian former professional racing cyclist. He rode in two editions of the Tour de France, three editions of the Giro d'Italia and one edition of the Vuelta a España.

References

External links
 

1968 births
Living people
Italian male cyclists
Italian mountain bikers
Cyclists from the Province of Treviso
Tour de Suisse stage winners